Dirk Schrade (born 29 June 1978 in Münsingen) is a German equestrian. At the 2012 Summer Olympics he competed in the Individual eventing and team eventing, where Germany won the gold medal.

Notable Horses 

 Grand Amour 7 - 2000 Dark Bay Bavarian Warmblood Mare (Cabaret x Weltrang L)
 2007 FEI Eventing Young Horse World Championships - 12th Place
 Plan B - 2002 Bay Westfalen Gelding (Pavarotti van de Helle x Labrador)
 2008 FEI Eventing Young Horse World Championships - 19th Place
 King Artus - 1996 Bay Holsteiner Gelding (King Milford XX x Lorenz)
 2009 Pau CCI**** Winner
 2009 FEI World Cup Final - 11th Place
 2011 European Championships - Fourth Place Individual
 2012 London Olympics - Team Gold Medal, Individual 26th Place
 Gadget de la Cere - 1994 Bay Anglo Arabian Gelding (Athos de Ceran x Samuel)
 2010 World Equestrian Games - Team Fifth Place
 Hop and Skip - 1999 Chestnut British Sport Horse Gelding (Skippy II)
 2013 European Championships - Team Gold Medal, Individual Sixth Place
 2014 World Equestrian Games - Team Gold Medal
 2015 European Championships - Team Gold Medal, Individual Seventh Place

References

External links 
 
 
 
 

German male equestrians

Living people
Olympic equestrians of Germany
Equestrians at the 2012 Summer Olympics
Olympic gold medalists for Germany
Olympic medalists in equestrian
1978 births
Medalists at the 2012 Summer Olympics
People from Münsingen, Germany
Sportspeople from Tübingen (region)